The Cueva Alfredo Jahn Natural Monument Also Alfredo Jahn Cave Natural Monument or Tapa de Cambural Cave It is a protected area with the status of a natural monument that is located 4 km west of the town of Birongo, Miranda State, at the eastern end of the Coastal Range of the Cordillera de la Costa. With a 4.29 km gallery development, it is the largest cave in central Venezuela, the sixth in Venezuela and one of the most visited in the country.

It was decreed as a Natural Monument on December 12, 1978 with Decree No. 2989 published in Official Gazette No. 2,417 of March 7, 1979. The monument was named in honor of Alfredo Jahn, pioneer of various scientific disciplines in Venezuela as Geography, geography, topography, astronomy, anthropology, linguistics and botany, and who was also founder of the Venezuelan Society of Natural Sciences.

It is a moist cave, still active, which has been formed by the action of the Cambural Gorge. Its calcite walls are covered with spectacular stalagmites, stalactites and columns, which reach its maximum development in the Hall of the Chaguaramo or Hall of the Rain.

The temperature inside the cave ranges between 22 °C and 26 °C. The cave is surrounded by a pre-montane seasonal semideciduous forest and presents three dense tree layers.

See also
List of national parks of Venezuela
Morros de Macaira Natural Monument

References

Natural monuments of Venezuela
Caves of Venezuela
Protected areas established in 1978